The Indian Scout FTR750 is a competition-only motorcycle engine made by Indian Motorcycle Manufacturing Company for flat track racing. It is a fuel-injected, liquid-cooled, four-valve-per-cylinder V-twin. A single-pin crankshaft riding on plain bearings carries side-by-side steel connecting rods. It is the first all-new flat track racing motor from Indian Motorcycle in decades.

Competition

On June 14, 2016 Jared Mees announced that he will join Indian as their flat track test rider. On September 6, 2016, Joe Kopp was announced as the first rider to race the FTR750 at the upcoming Santa Rosa Mile in Santa Rosa, California on September 25, 2016.  The FTR750 is slated to be used in GNC1 competition in AMA Pro Flat Track racing full-time in 2017.

Street-legal motorcycle 
Indian markets the FTR1200 as a street-legal rendition of the FTR750. They have some appearance similarities including a steel trellis frame and trellis swingarm.

Notes

External links
Google search for images

FTR 750
Indian Motorcycles engines
Motorcycles introduced in 2016
Motorcycle engines
Racing motorcycles